Oliver Tomaszczyk (born 24 November 1986) is an English rugby union player who played for Newcastle Falcons in the Aviva Premiership where he played prop.

He was educated at Merchiston Castle School and appeared for the England U18 rugby union side during 2004-2005. Having been accepted to Oxford University where he read Modern Languages, he represented Oxford University in The Varsity Match against Cambridge University in 2006.

He plays as a prop and was a member of the Newcastle Falcons academy. He played for the Argentinian side Lomas Athletic in 2006. He has also represented Tynedale in England, Oloron in France, and Haywards Heath RFC while completing his studies at Oxford. He joined Worcester in 2010 after completion of his Modern Languages degree at Oxford University where he was part of the Warriors side that won promotion back to the Premiership in 2011. In 2012 he signed a deal that took him back to Newcastle Falcons for the 2012-13 season.

References

1986 births
Living people
Oxford University RFC players
Newcastle Falcons players
People educated at Merchiston Castle School
Tynedale R.F.C. players
Worcester Warriors players
Rugby union props
Rugby union players from London